Kim Jong-ki is a South Korean businessman and anti-youth violence advocate. Kim established the Foundation for Preventing Youth Violence (FPYV) after his son committed suicide due to school bullying. The FPYV raises awareness on the issue of school bullying and creates programs for youth development. In 2004, the organization lobbied for a legislation to prevent school violence. He is a recipient of Ramon Magsaysay Award in 2019 for his advocacy for the youth.

References

South Korean businesspeople
Living people
Year of birth missing (living people)